Justice Russell may refer to:

 Chambers Russell (1713–1766), associate justice of the Massachusetts Supreme Judicial Court
 Charles Russell, Baron Russell of Killowen (1832–1900), Lord Chief Justice of England
 Charles Ritchie Russell, Baron Russell of Killowen (1908–1986), British judge and law lord
 Charles S. Russell (born 1926), associate justice of the Supreme Court of Virginia
 James Russell (judge) (1842–1893), acting chief justice of the Supreme Court of Hong Kong
 Joseph Russell (judge) (1702–1780), associate justice and chief justice of the Rhode Island Supreme Court
 Mary Rhodes Russell (born 1958), associate justice of the Supreme Court of Missouri
 Richard Russell Sr. (1861–1938), chief justice of the Supreme Court of Georgia
 Wesley G. Russell Jr. (born 1970), associate justice of the Supreme Court of Virginia

See also
Judge Russell (disambiguation)